
Year 15 BC was either a common year starting on Tuesday, Wednesday or Thursday or a leap year starting on Wednesday (link will display the full calendar) of the Julian calendar (the sources differ, see leap year error for further information) and a common year starting on Monday of the Proleptic Julian calendar. At the time, it was known as the Year of the Consulship of Drusus and Piso (or, less frequently, year 739 Ab urbe condita). The denomination 15 BC for this year has been used since the early medieval period, when the Anno Domini calendar era became the prevalent method in Europe for naming years.

Events 
 By place 

 Roman Empire 
 The Raeti tribes of the Alps are subjugated by Tiberius and Nero Claudius Drusus and the new Roman province of Raetia is established with Chur (in modern-day Switzerland) as its capital. During the campaign, Roman triremes destroy the fleet of the Vindelici in the Battle of Lake Constance. Augsburg is founded as Augusta Vindelicorum; and Legio XXI Rapax is stationed at Regensburg in the new province.
 Drusus decides to improve the passage through the Alps for military control of Noricum and Raetia and builds the Via Claudia Augusta through Italy.
 Marcus Livius Drusus Libo and Lucius Calpurnius Piso are Roman Consuls.

Births 
 May 24 – Germanicus, Roman general (d. AD 19)
 Alexander, Herodian prince of Judea
 Phaedrus, Roman fabulist and writer

Deaths 
 Lucius Munatius Plancus, Roman consul (b. c. 87 BC)
 Vedius Pollio, Roman equestrian (friend of Augustus)

References